Perosamine (or GDP-perosamine) is a mannose-derived 4-aminodeoxysugar produced by some bacteria.

Biological role
N-acetyl-perosamine is found in the O-antigen of Gram-negative bacteria such as  Vibrio cholerae O1, E. coli O157:H7 and Caulobacter crescentus CB15. The sugar is also found in perimycin, an antibiotic produced by the Gram-positive organism Streptomyces coelicolor var. aminophilus.

Biosynthesis
Its biosynthesis from mannose-1-phosphate follows a pathway similar to that of colitose, but is different in that it is aminated and does not undergo 3-OH deoxygenation or C-5 epimerization.

GDP-4-keto-6-deoxymannose-4-aminotransferase (GDP-perosamine synthase)
GDP-perosamine synthase is a PLP-dependent enzyme that transfers a nitrogen from glutamate to the 4-keto position of GDP-4-keto-6-deoxymannose during the biosynthesis of GDP-perosamine.

References 

Hexosamines
Deoxy sugars